The 2015 Segundona was the 21st season of the second-tier football league in Angola. The season ran from 11 July to 4 October 2015.

The league comprised 2 series of 6 teams, the winner of each series being automatically promoted to the 2016 Girabola while the runners-up of each group contested for the third spot. At the end of the regular season, the three series winners played a round-robin tournament to determine the league champion.

Real M'buco and Mpatu a Ponta who were supposed to contest in group A, withdrew citing financial reasons as did Malanje Sport Clube in group B for the same reason.

All teams in each group play in a double round robin system (home and away).

Serie A

Serie B

2016 Girabola playoff 

* The game was interrupted at 75 min due to heavy rain and resumed the following day for the remaining 15 minutes

2015 Segundona title match

See also
2015 Girabola

References

External links
Federação Angolana de Futebol

Segundona
2
Angola
Angola